Gurdon can refer to:

People
 Brampton Gurdon (disambiguation)
 Charles Gurdon (1855–1931), English rower and rugby union forward
 Edward Temple Gurdon, often known as Temple Gurdon, rugby union international
 Francis Gurdon (1861–1929), Anglican bishop, the third Bishop of Hull in the modern era
 Henry Gurdon Marquand (1819–1902), American financier, philanthropist and collector
 John Gurdon, British developmental biologist and Nobel Prize Laureate
 John Everard Gurdon, British flying ace
 John Gurdon (MP) (1595–1679) English politician
 Madeleine Gurdon (born 1962), English former equestrian sportswoman
 Thornhagh Gurdon (1663–1733), English antiquary
 William Brampton Gurdon (1840–1911), British civil servant
 Gurdon Denison (1744–1807), physician and political figure in Nova Scotia
 Gurdon Wattles (1855-1932), early businessman, banker and civic leader in Omaha, Nebraska
 Gurdon Saltonstall (1666–1724)
 Gurdon Saltonstall Hubbard (1802–1886), American fur trader
 Gurdon Saltonstall Mumford (1764-1831), United States Representative from New York
 Gurdon Buck (1807–1877), pioneer military plastic surgeon during the Civil War

Places
 Gurdon, Arkansas, a town in the United States
 The Gurdon Light is an unexplained light located near railroad tracks in a wooded area of Gurdon, Arkansas

Miscellaneous
 The Wellcome Trust / Cancer Research UK Gurdon Institute is a research facility at the University of Cambridge